Ignacio Francisco "Nacho" Calderón González (born December 13, 1943) is a Mexican former football goalkeeper who played 60 times for the Mexico national team between 1965 and 1974.

Calderón started his playing career with Guadalajara. In 1962, they won three Mexican league championships in 1963–64, 1964–95 an// 1969–70. He was called up to the Mexico national team for the first time in 1965.

Calderón played in two FIFA World Cups for the Mexico national team, and in the 1970 World Cup he set a World Cup record of 310 minutes without conceding a goal.

In 1974 Calderón joined the U de G team that finished as runners up in the Liga MX in 1975–76 and 1976–77; and shared the CONCACAF Champions' Cup in 1978.

After a three-month spell with Atlas in 1980 Calderón retired at the age of 36.

Titles

References

External links
 
 Statistics at fifa.com
 
 

1943 births
Living people
Footballers from Guadalajara, Jalisco
Association football goalkeepers
Mexico international footballers
Olympic footballers of Mexico
Footballers at the 1964 Summer Olympics
1966 FIFA World Cup players
1970 FIFA World Cup players
C.D. Guadalajara footballers
Leones Negros UdeG footballers
Atlas F.C. footballers
Liga MX players
Mexican footballers